The Mărăloiu is a right tributary of the river Someșul Mic in Romania. It discharges into the Someșul Mic in Apahida.

References

 Screening-ul substanțelor periculoase la domenii de activitate industrială relevante 

Rivers of Romania
Rivers of Cluj County